Margarita Island, also known as Mompox Island, is an inland river island in the Magdalena River, near Mompos town in the Bolivar Department of interior Colombia.

Its area is about 2200 km².   There are numerous islands in the region.

References

River islands of Colombia
Geography of Bolívar Department